was a village located in Ishikawa District, Ishikawa Prefecture, Japan.

As of 2003, the village had an estimated population of 698 and a population density of 5.08 persons per km². The total area was 137.52 km².

On February 1, 2005, Oguchi, along with the city of Mattō, the towns of Mikawa and Tsurugi, and the villages of Kawachi, Shiramine, Torigoe and Yoshinodani (all from Ishikawa District), was merged to create the city of Hakusan and no longer exists as an independent municipality.

External links
 Official website of Hakusan 

Dissolved municipalities of Ishikawa Prefecture
Hakusan, Ishikawa